Giacomo Antonio Leofanti (died 1494) was a Roman Catholic prelate who served as Bishop of Patti (1486–1494).

Biography
On 9 February 1486, he was appointed by Pope Innocent VIII as Bishop of Patti. He served as Bishop of Patti until his death in 1494.

References

External links and additional sources
 (for Chronology of Bishops) 
 (for Chronology of Bishops) 

1494 deaths
15th-century Roman Catholic bishops in Sicily
Bishops appointed by Pope Innocent VIII